The St. Louis Cardinals 2007 season was the team's 126th season in St. Louis, Missouri and the 116th season in the National League. The season started with the team trying to defend their 2006 World Series championship.  During the offseason, the Cardinals were faced with the challenge of handling their starting rotation.  Four of their five starters were free agents, including Jeff Suppan (the 2006 NLCS MVP), Jeff Weaver (the winning pitcher in the World Series Game 5 clincher), Mark Mulder, and Jason Marquis.  In the end, Suppan, Weaver, and Marquis all signed with other teams.  The Cardinals signed Mulder, who ended the 2006 season on the disabled list, to a new two-year contract, but Mulder remained on the disabled list after undergoing shoulder surgery.

To replace the departed pitchers, the Cardinals promoted Adam Wainwright, who spent 2006 in relief and took the closer's job from injured Jason Isringhausen, to the rotation.  They signed free agent pitcher Kip Wells to fill another spot.  The team entered 2007 with a rotation of Chris Carpenter, Wells, Wainwright and Anthony Reyes, with reliever Braden Looper assuming the fifth starter's role until Mulder's return.

In contrast with the rotation, the rest of the team remained stable.  Every member of the Cardinals' playoff bullpen remained under contract for 2007, though the Cardinals signed free agent relievers Ryan Franklin and Russ Springer for reinforcement and middle reliever Josh Kinney suffered an injury in spring training that required Tommy John surgery and forced him to miss the entire 2007 season. Every position player for the Cardinals returned in 2007 except for midseason acquisition Ronnie Belliard, who signed as a free agent with the Washington Nationals.  To replace Belliard, the Cardinals signed Adam Kennedy, a former Cardinal who was traded to the then-Anaheim Angels for Jim Edmonds in 2000, and was teammates with current Cardinals David Eckstein and Scott Spiezio when they won the 2002 World Series with Anaheim.

In spring training, the Birds were 16–10–3 with a team batting average of .255 and a 2.29 team ERA.  Attendance at Roger Dean Stadium was 102,619.  As of 2022, this was the Cardinals last losing season.

Regular season

April: The death of Josh Hancock
The Cardinals began the season by raising their championship banner for winning the 2006 World Series.  They played the first game of the 2007 season in a rematch of the 2006 NLCS as they hosted the Mets for a three-game series.  The homestand ended with disappointment, however, as the Mets swept the Cardinals, outscoring them 20–2.  Later in April the Cardinals suffered a major setback when ace pitcher Chris Carpenter was placed on the disabled list due to arthritis and impingement.  The team struggled for most of the month of April, getting off to a 10–14 start.

At approximately 12:35 am CST on April 29, 2007, pitcher Josh Hancock died in a car accident in St. Louis.  Hancock, a 29-year-old reliever who threw 77 innings for the Cardinals during the 2006 season, collided with a tow truck stopped on Interstate 64 to assist another motorist.  The Cardinals' game against the Cubs scheduled for later that day was postponed due to the accident.  Autopsy reports showed that Hancock was intoxicated with a blood alcohol level almost twice the legal limit in Missouri.  In response the Cardinals banned alcohol from the team's clubhouse.  The tragedy brought back memories of the loss of former Cardinal pitcher Darryl Kile, who died of coronary disease in 2002.  Hancock became the second MLB player in the previous 25 years to die during the regular season.  After Hancock's death, the Cardinals began wearing a black patch reading "32" on their uniforms in his memory.

May
The team's offensive struggles grew worse with the start of the new month.  St. Louis went two weeks without hitting a home run; Chris Duncan hit one in a loss to the Brewers on May 1 and again in a May 15 victory over the Dodgers.  On May 13, they were shut out for the sixth time in their first 35 games in a 3–0 loss to the Padres.  A series in Detroit featuring a rematch of the teams from the 2006 World Series ended in a three-game Tiger sweep and dropped the Cardinals' record to 16–25 for the season.  Anthony Reyes was sent down to the minors on May 27 after compiling an 0–8 record and 6.08 ERA.  Catcher Yadier Molina was placed on the disabled list on May 30 with a fractured wrist suffered from a foul tip that struck his hand while catching.  The team ended May with a 22–29 record.

June
Kip Wells' terrible season continued on June 2, becoming the majors' first 10-game loser, and the first Cardinals pitcher in 16 years to lose ten games before the All-Star break.  Wells went to the bullpen shortly thereafter. Looper went on the DL on June 18, after struggling following a hot start to the season.  Kennedy lost the starting second base job to Aaron Miles.  The Cardinals, whose starting rotation had fallen to dead last in the NL in ERA, acquired Mike Maroth from the Detroit Tigers for a player to be named later.  Injuries continued to plague the team as Eckstein, Johnson and Edmonds went on the disabled list.  Anthony Reyes, recalled from the minors, dropped to 0–10 after a loss to the Mets on June 28.  New acquisition Troy Percival, a veteran relief pitcher who had been retired at the start of the season but signed a minor-league deal with St. Louis, earned a victory in his first big-league appearance in two years on June 29 against Cincinnati.  (Percival became the fourth member of the 2002 World Champion Angels to play on the Cardinals, joining Kennedy, Spiezio and Eckstein, and the fifth ex-Angel overall, also including Edmonds).

Despite the injuries and the turnover in the pitching staff, the Cardinals played better in June, going 13–13 for the month after losing records in April and May.  However, they were still well behind the Brewers.  On June 30 they fell 10.5 games behind Milwaukee, the furthest out of first place they were all season.

July
Anthony Reyes was sent down to the minor leagues again on July 2.
St. Louis entered the All-Star Break with a 40–45 record, in third place in the division, 7½ games behind Milwaukee.  Albert Pujols was the only Cardinal on the NL All-Star roster. St. Louis participated in another franchise's milestone when their 10–2 defeat of Philadelphia on July 15 made the Phillies the first team in MLB history to lose 10,000 games.

The Cardinals could not find consistency for most of July, never losing or winning more than two games in a row until the end of the month.  The team suffered a devastating setback when Carpenter, who had been on track to return sometime in late July, was diagnosed with ligament damage and had season-ending Tommy John surgery.  Jim Edmonds returned to the team after spending over a month on the disabled list.  New pitcher Mike Maroth struggled terribly in July, posting an 11.86 ERA for the month.  However, Anthony Reyes, called up to the big leagues again, got his first win of the year on July 28 after an 0–10 start.

In yet another attempt to bolster their faltering rotation, on July 31 St. Louis acquired Joel Piñeiro from the Red Sox for cash and a player to be named later.  The Cardinals had their first winning month of the year in July, going 15–11.  After spending most of the month far behind Milwaukee, St. Louis took three of four from the Brewers at the end of July to close the gap to six games.

August
The momentum built by the four-game win streak at the end of July was promptly dissipated as the Cardinals lost five in a row to Pittsburgh and Washington.  Manager Tony La Russa, in an effort to increase offensive production, on August 4 began batting Cardinal pitchers eighth in the lineup.  LaRussa as justification cited 1998, when he batted the pitcher eighth for the whole second half of the season and a team that was four games under .500 before the change played ten games over .500 after.  LaRussa's revised lineup marked the first time that any team had hit its starting pitcher anywhere other than the ninth spot in the lineup since the Florida Marlins moved Dontrelle Willis up in the batting order for a few games in 2005.

The Cardinals snapped their losing streak on August 6, beating San Diego 10–5.  St. Louis scored ten runs on ten consecutive hits in the fifth inning, becoming the 12th team in MLB history to get ten base hits in a row.  Three days later, Scott Spiezio, the Cardinals' utilityman and third base backup, was placed on the restricted list due to unspecified substance abuse problems.  LaRussa told reporters that "What we want more than anything else is to do whatever is best for him."  Spiezio's replacement was both a surprise and a familiar face: Rick Ankiel.  Ankiel, once a promising young pitcher for the Cardinals—striking out 194 batters in 175 innings in 2000 at the age of twenty—suffered a catastrophic attack of wildness in the 2000 postseason, throwing nine wild pitches and walking eleven batters in only four postseason innings.  Further wildness sent him back to the minors in 2001, and after four years struggling to overcome his wildness and subsequent injuries, Ankiel quit pitching in 2005 and announced he would try to make it back to the big leagues as a hitter.  After hitting 31 home runs in 2007 for the Memphis Redbirds (St. Louis's AAA affiliate), Ankiel was called up to the big leagues to fill Spiezio's roster spot.  In his first game back, Ankiel hit a three-run homer and the Cardinals won 5–0.

The return of Rick Ankiel to the lineup coincided with the best stretch of play by the Cardinals in 2007.  St. Louis won five in a row and eight out of ten against L.A., San Diego and Milwaukee, advancing to two games under .500 and 2½ games behind the Brewers.  Continued strong starting pitching and hot hitting from Pujols, rookie infielder Brendan Ryan, and others propelled the Cardinals to the .500 mark on August 28, the first time since they were 6–6 on April 16 that they did not have a losing record.

Scott Rolen was forced out of the lineup due to tightness and pain in his surgically repaired shoulder.  Rolen decided to have season-ending shoulder surgery shortly after.  Brendan Ryan was named the starting third baseman in Rolen's place and the Cardinals traded for backup infielder Russell Branyan right before the August trade deadline.  St. Louis went 15–13 in August and finished the month 65–66 and in third place in the division, two games behind the Cubs and one-half game behind Milwaukee.  The Cardinals' 8–5 victory over Cincinnati on the last day of the month gave Tony La Russa victory #1,042 as the Cardinal manager, passing Red Schoendienst to become the winningest Cardinal manager of all time.  In the same game, Cardinal right fielder Juan Encarnación was struck in the eye and severely injured with a foul ball.  Encarnacion was diagnosed with severe injuries to his left eye and multiple fractures of the orbital bone.  The injury ended his season and is believed to be potentially career-threatening.

The last off-day for the team in 2007 came on August 27, when they had four games remaining in the month, and then 31 games in September.  This set a new major-league baseball record for a team with the longest number of consecutive days played (35) at the end of the season without a day off.

September
The Cardinals entered September facing a stretch run of 31 games in 30 days, due to all three off-days in the month being taken up by makeups of earlier postponements.  Former Cardinal Miguel Cairo, recently signed by St. Louis after he was waived by the Yankees, was brought up to the big club as the first of the September callups.

On September 2, the Cardinals completed a three-game sweep of Cincinnati that put them at 67–66, the first time they were over .500 since they were 6–5 after the April 15 game.  They entered the game on September 7 against the Arizona Diamondbacks with a chance to take sole possession of first place, but instead the D-backs won and went on to sweep the weekend series.  September 7 was also the day that the New York Daily News reported that Rick Ankiel received a year's worth of human growth hormone in 2004 while he was trying to come back as a pitcher.  HGH was legal at that time but has since been banned by MLB.  In response Ankiel said that he had a valid prescription and that all of his medications were taken under a doctor's care.

The sweep in Arizona began a devastating slump that took the Cardinals out of contention in the NL Central.  They lost nine in a row to Arizona, Chicago, Cincinnati, and Chicago again.  The ninth loss came to the Cubs in the first game of a doubleheader on September 15, the game rescheduled from April 29 after the death of Josh Hancock.  It was the longest losing streak for the franchise since the 1980 Cardinals lost ten in a row.  The Cardinals were officially eliminated on September 21, as they lost to the visiting Houston Astros at Busch Stadium.  After being eliminated from postseason, St. Louis played out the string by going 7–2 the rest of the way, and finished the season with a 78–84 record, finishing in third place, seven games behind the NL Central winning Chicago Cubs.  It was the first losing season for the franchise since the 1999 Cardinals went 75–86, and as of 2022, the last losing season the team has endured. 
    
On September 22, 2007, hosting the Houston Astros, the Cardinals set a one-day attendance record in their new Busch Stadium with 46,237.    
    
In 2007, the Cardinals drew an all-time attendance record for any year with 3,552,180 in their 81 home games (breaking their previous record set in 2005), an average of 43,854 per game.

Aftermath
Owner William DeWitt Jr. fired Walt Jocketty, General Manager for the Cardinals since 1995, on October 3. Assistant GM John Mozeliak replaced Jocketty in an interim capacity before being named the new GM on October 31, 2007.
 
On October 22, Manager Tony La Russa, after considering moving elsewhere when his contract expired, signed a new two-year deal guaranteeing his record 13th and 14th seasons as Cardinal manager, the longest tenure in franchise history.

No Cardinal won a Gold Glove. Perhaps the most surprising denial was to catcher Yadier Molina, who was denied the award despite his .991 fielding percentage.
Both Molina and Albert Pujols previously (November 1) won the prestigious Fielding Bible Award, which is given to only one person at each position in the major leagues.

Season standings

National League Central

Record vs. opponents

Roster

Game log

|- style="background-color:#ffbbbb"
| 1 || April 1 || Mets || 6 – 1 || Glavine (1-0) || Carpenter (0-1) || || 45,429 || 0-1
|- style="background-color:#ffbbbb"
| 2 || April 3 || Mets || 4 – 1 || Hernández (1-0) || Wells (0-1) || Wagner (1) || 45,440 || 0-2
|- style="background-color:#ffbbbb"
| 3 || April 4 || Mets || 10 – 0 || Maine (1-0) || Looper (0-1) || || 45,423 || 0-3
|- style="background-color:#bbffbb"
| 4 || April 6 || @ Astros || 4 – 2 || Wainwright (1-0) || Rodríguez (0-1) || Isringhausen (1) || 43,430 || 1-3
|- style="background-color:#ffbbbb"
| 5 || April 7 || @ Astros || 5 – 1 || Oswalt (1-0) || Reyes (0-1) || || 41,885 || 1-4
|- style="background-color:#bbffbb"
| 6 || April 8 || @ Astros || 10 – 1 || Wells (1-1) || Jennings (0-1) || || 36,273 || 2-4
|- style="background-color:#bbffbb"
| 7 || April 9 || @ Pirates || 3 – 0 || Looper (1-1) || Snell (0-1) || Isringhausen (2) || 38,429 || 3-4
|- style="background-color:#bbffbb"
| 8 || April 10 || @ Pirates || 3 – 2  || Thompson (1-0) || Wasdin (0-1) || Isringhausen (3) || 12,468 || 4-4
|- style="background-color:#bbffbb"
| 9 || April 11 || @ Pirates || 3 – 2 || Franklin (1-0) || Torres (0-1) || || 9,959 || 5-4
|- style="background-color:#bbbbbb"
| -- || April 13 || Brewers || colspan=5|Postponed (rain),  || 5-4
|- style="background-color:#ffbbbb"
| 10 || April 14 || Brewers || 3 – 2 || Suppan (1-1)|| Wells (1-2)|| Cordero (4) || 42,805 || 5-5
|- style="background-color:#bbffbb"
| 11 || April 15 || Brewers || 10 – 2 || Looper (2-1) || Sheets (1-1) || || 44,153 || 6-5
|- style="background-color:#ffbbbb"
| 12 || April 16 || Pirates || 3 – 2 || Snell (1-1) || Reyes (0-2) || Torres (5) || 43,026 || 6-6
|- style="background-color:#ffbbbb"
| 13 || April 17 || Pirates || 6 – 1 || Gorzelanny (2-0) || Wainwright (1-1) || || 42,446 || 6-7
|- style="background-color:#ffbbbb"
| 14 || April 18 || @ Giants || 6 – 5  || Sánchez (1-0) || Hancock (0-1) || || 40,532 || 6-8
|- style="background-color:#ffbbbb"
| 15 || April 19 || @ Giants || 6 – 2 || Lowry (1-2) || Wells (1-3) || Hennessey (1) || 37,398 || 6-9
|- style="background-color:#bbffbb"
| 16 || April 20 || @ Cubs || 2 – 1 || Looper (3-1) || Lilly (1-2) || Isringhausen (4) || 38,955 || 7-9
|- style="background-color:#ffbbbb"
| 17 || April 21 || @ Cubs || 6 – 0 || Marquis (2-1) || Reyes (0-3) || || 41,637 || 7-10
|- style="background-color:#bbffbb"
| 18 || April 22 || @ Cubs || 12 – 9  || Isringhausen (1-0) || Dempster (0-1) || || 40,193 || 8-10
|- style="background-color:#ffbbbb"
| 19 || April 24 || Reds || 10 – 3 || Harang (3-0) || Wells (1-4) || || 42,309 || 8-11
|- style="background-color:#bbffbb"
| 20 || April 25 || Reds || 5 – 2 || Flores (1-0) || Saarloos (0-2) || Isringhausen (5) || 42,225 || 9-11
|- style="background-color:#bbffbb"
| 21 || April 26 || Reds || 7 – 5 || Springer (1-0) || Lohse (1-1) || Isringhausen (6) || 42,503 || 10-11
|- style="background-color:#ffbbbb"
| 22 || April 27 || Cubs || 5 – 3 || Marquis (3-1) || Reyes (0-4) || Dempster (4) || 45,131 || 10-12
|- style="background-color:#ffbbbb"
| 23 || April 28 || Cubs || 8 – 1 || Zambrano (2-2) || Wainwright (1-2) || || 45,015 || 10-13
|- style="background-color:#bbbbbb"
| -- || April 29 || Cubs || colspan=5|Postponed (death of Cardinals pitcher Josh Hancock),  || 10-13
|- style="background-color:#ffbbbb"
| 24 || April 30 || @ Brewers || 7 – 1 || Suppan (4-1) || Wells (1-5) || || 20,191 || 10-14

|- style="background-color:#ffbbbb"
| 25 || May 1 || @ Brewers || 12 – 2 || Sheets (2-2) || Looper (3-2) || || 20,446 || 10-15
|- style="background-color:#ffbbbb"
| 26 || May 2 || @ Brewers || 4 – 0 || Villanueva (2-0) || Reyes (0-5) || || 23,299 || 10-16
|- style="background-color:#bbffbb"
| 27 || May 4 || Astros || 3 – 2 || Wainwright (2-2) || Williams (0-5) || Isringhausen (7) || 44,117 || 11-16
|- style="background-color:#ffbbbb"
| 28 || May 5 || Astros || 13 – 0 || Albers (1-1) || Wells (1-6) || || 44,881 || 11-17
|- style="background-color:#bbffbb"
| 29 || May 6 || Astros || 3 – 1 || Looper (4-2) || Sampson (3-2) || Isringhausen (8) || 44,453 || 12-17
|- style="background-color:#ffbbbb"
| 30 || May 7 || Rockies || 3 – 2 || McClellan (1-0) || Falkenborg (0-1) || Fuentes (8) || 42,285 || 12-18
|- style="background-color:#bbffbb"
| 31 || May 8 || Rockies || 4 – 1 || Jiménez (1-0) || Bautista (2-1) || Isringhausen (9) || 42,763 || 13-18
|- style="background-color:#bbffbb"
| 32 || May 9 || Rockies || 9 – 2 || Wainwright (3-2) || Hirsh (2-3) || || 43,001 || 14-18
|- style="background-color:#ffbbbb"
| 33 || May 11 || @ Padres || 7 – 0 || Peavy (5-1) || Wells (1-7) || || 38,901 || 14-19
|- style="background-color:#bbffbb"
| 34 || May 12 || @ Padres || 5 – 0 || Looper (5-2) || Young (4-3) || || 44,082 || 15-19
|- style="background-color:#ffbbbb"
| 35 || May 13 || @ Padres || 3 – 0 || Germano (1-0) || Reyes (0-6) || Hoffman (10) || 36,616 || 15-20
|- style="background-color:#bbffbb"
| 36 || May 14 || @ Dodgers || 8 – 4 || Thompson (2-0) || Tomko (1-4) || Isringhausen (10) || 35,707 || 16-20
|- style="background-color:#ffbbbb"
| 37 || May 15 || @ Dodgers || 9 – 7 || Lowe (4-4) || Wainwright (3-3) || Saito (12) || 38,954 || 16-21
|- style="background-color:#ffbbbb"
| 38 || May 16 || @ Dodgers || 5 – 4 || Wolf (5-3) || Wells (1-8) || Saito (13) || 38,252 || 16-22
|- style="background-color:#ffbbbb"
| 39 || May 18 || @ Tigers || 14 – 4 || Miller (1-0) || Looper (5-3) || || 40,816 || 16-23
|- style="background-color:#ffbbbb"
| 40 || May 19 || @ Tigers || 8 – 7 || Robertson (4-3)|| Reyes (0-7) || Jones (14) || 42,625 || 16-24
|- style="background-color:#ffbbbb"
| 41 || May 20 || @ Tigers || 6 – 3 || Verlander (4-1) || Thompson (2-1) || Seay (1) || 39,562 || 16-25
|- style="background-color:#bbffbb"
| 42 || May 22 || Pirates || 9 – 4 || Wainwright (4-3) || Duke (1-5) || || 42,679 || 17-25
|- style="background-color:#bbffbb"
| 43 || May 23 || Pirates || 5 – 3 || Wells (2-8) || Snell (4-3) || Isringhausen (11) || 42,245 || 18-25
|- style="background-color:#bbffbb"
| 44 || May 24 || Pirates || 3 – 1 || Looper (6-3) || Gorzelanny (5-3) || Isringhausen (12) || 44,296 || 19-25
|- style="background-color:#ffbbbb"
| 45 || May 25 || Nationals || 5 – 4 || Bowie (1-2) || Reyes (0-8) || Cordero (7) || 43,618 || 19-26
|- style="background-color:#bbffbb"
| 46 || May 26 || Nationals || 8 – 6 || Thompson (3-1) || Speigner (1-1) || Isringhausen (13) || 44,270 || 20-26
|- style="background-color:#ffbbbb"
| 47 || May 27 || Nationals || 7 – 2 || Rivera (1-1) || Wainwright (4-4) || || 44,578 || 20-27
|- style="background-color:#ffbbbb"
| 48 || May 28 || @ Rockies || 6 – 2 || Francis (4-4) || Wells (2-9) || || 31,575 || 20-28
|- style="background-color:#ffbbbb"
| 49 || May 29 || @ Rockies || 8 – 3 || López (2-0) || Looper (6-4) || || 18,213 || 20-29
|- style="background-color:#bbffbb"
| 50 || May 30 || @ Rockies || 8 – 4 || Wellemeyer (1-0) || Hirsh (2-5) || || 19,062 || 21-29
|- style="background-color:#bbffbb"
| 51 || May 31 || @ Rockies || 7 – 3 || Thompson (4-1) || Cook (4-2) || || 19,097 || 22-29

|- style="background-color:#bbffbb"
| 52 || June 1 || @ Astros || 8 – 1 || Franklin (2-0) || Qualls (4-3) || || 36,784 || 23-29
|- style="background-color:#ffbbbb"
| 53 || June 2 || @ Astros || 8 – 3 || Sampson (5-5) || Wells (2-10) || || 39,234 || 23-30
|- style="background-color:#bbffbb"
| 54 || June 3 || @ Astros || 8 – 6  || Isringhausen (2-0) || Wheeler (0-2) || || 40,483 || 24-30
|- style="background-color:#bbffbb"
| 55 || June 5 || Reds || 4 – 3 || Isringhausen (3-0) || Burton (0-1) || || 43,532 || 25-30
|- style="background-color:#bbffbb"
| 56 || June 6 || Reds || 6 – 4 || Johnson (1-0) || Arroyo (2-7) || Isringhausen (14) || 42,029 || 26-30
|- style="background-color:#ffbbbb"
| 57 || June 7 || Reds || 5 – 1 || Lohse (3-7) || Wainwright (4-5) || || 43,597 || 26-31
|- style="background-color:#ffbbbb"
| 58 || June 8 || Angels || 10 – 6 || Carrasco (1-1) || Johnson (1-1) || || 44,156 || 26-32
|- style="background-color:#ffbbbb"
| 59 || June 9 || Angels || 9 – 3 || Santana (5-6) || Looper (6-5) || || 45,392 || 26-33
|- style="background-color:#bbffbb"
| 60 || June 10 || Angels || 9 – 6 || Wellemeyer (2-1) || Bootcheck (1-1) || || 43,612 || 27-33
|- style="background-color:#ffbbbb"
| 61 || June 12 || @ Royals || 8 – 1 || Bannister (3-3) || Thompson (4-2) || || 29,354 || 27-34
|- style="background-color:#bbffbb"
| 62 || June 13 || @ Royals || 7 – 3 || Wainwright (5-5) || Pérez (3-7) || || 25,555 || 28-34
|- style="background-color:#ffbbbb"
| 63 || June 14 || @ Royals || 17 – 8 || Greinke (4-4) || Wells (2-11) || || 28,837 || 28-35
|- style="background-color:#ffbbbb"
| 64 || June 15 || @ Athletics || 14 – 3 || Haren (8-2) || Looper (6-6) || || 24,241 || 28-36
|- style="background-color:#bbffbb"
| 65 || June 16 || @ Athletics || 15 – 6 || Springer (2-0) || DiNardo (2-3) || || 28,572 || 29-36
|- style="background-color:#bbffbb"
| 66 || June 17 || @ Athletics || 10 – 6 || Springer (3-0) || Lewis (0-2) || || 35,077 || 30-36
|- style="background-color:#ffbbbb"
| 67 || June 18 || Royals || 5 – 3 || Pérez (4-7) || Wainwright (5-6) || Dotel (6) || 43,524 || 30-37
|- style="background-color:#bbffbb"
| 68 || June 19 || Royals || 5 – 1 || Thompson (5-2) || Elarton (2-3) || || 42,712 || 31-37
|- style="background-color:#bbffbb"
| 69 || June 20 || Royals || 7 – 6  || Wells (3-11) || de la Rosa (4-8) || || 42,623 || 32-37
|- style="background-color:#ffbbbb"
| 70 || June 22 || Phillies || 6 – 0 || Moyer (7-5) || Reyes (0-9) || || 45,360 || 32-38
|- style="background-color:#bbffbb"
| 71 || June 23 || Phillies || 8 – 3 || Wainwright (6-6) || Eaton (7-5) || || 45,336 || 33-38
|- style="background-color:#ffbbbb"
| 72 || June 24 || Phillies || 5 – 1 || Sanches (1-0) || Thompson (5-3) || || 44,899 || 33-39
|- style="background-color:#ffbbbb"
| 73 || June 25 || @ Mets || 2 – 1  || Heilman (6-3) || Springer (3-1) || || 40,075 || 33-40
|- style="background-color:#bbffbb"
| 74 || June 26 || @ Mets || 5 – 3  || Thompson (6-3) || Schoeneweis (0-2) || Flores (1) || 40,053 || 34-40
|- style="background-color:#ffbbbb"
| 75 || June 27 || @ Mets || 2 – 0  || Glavine (7-5) || Reyes (0-10) || || 40,948 || 34-41
|- style="background-color:#bbbbbb"
| -- || June 28 || @ Mets || colspan=5|Postponed (rain),  || 34-41
|- style="background-color:#bbffbb"
| 76 || June 29 || @ Reds || 4 – 2 || Percival (1-0) || McBeth (2-2) || Isringhausen (15) || 35,508 || 35-41
|- style="background-color:#ffbbbb"
| 77 || June 30 || @ Reds || 5 – 1 || Lohse (4-10) || Wainwright (6-7) || || 32,538 || 35-42

|- style="background-color:#bbffbb"
| 78 || July 1 || @ Reds || 11 – 7 || Percival (2-0) || Bailey (2-2) || || 24,126 || 36-42
|- style="background-color:#bbffbb"
| 79 || July 2 || D-backs || 11 – 3 || Springer (4-1) || Webb (8-6) || || 42,312 || 37-42
|- style="background-color:#ffbbbb"
| 80 || July 3 || D-backs || 7 – 1 || Petit (1-1) || Wellemeyer (2-2) || || 42,127 || 37-43
|- style="background-color:#bbffbb"
| 81 || July 4 || D-backs || 5 – 4 || Franklin (3-0) || Lyon (5-3) || Isringhausen (16) || 43,538 || 38-43
|- style="background-color:#bbffbb"
| 82 || July 5 || D-backs || 3 – 2 || Wainwright (7-7) || Davis (5-10) || Isringhausen (17) || 42,184 || 39-43
|- style="background-color:#ffbbbb"
| 83 || July 6 || Giants || 4 – 3 || Lowry (9-6) || Maroth (5-3) || Messenger (1) || 45,245 || 39-44
|- style="background-color:#ffbbbb"
| 84 || July 7 || Giants || 7 – 6 || Lincecum (4-2) || Looper (6-7) || Hennessey (5) || 45,355 || 39-45
|- style="background-color:#bbffbb"
| 85 || July 8 || Giants || 7 – 0 || Wellemeyer (3-2) || Zito (6-9) || || 44,613 || 40-45
|- style="background-color:#ffbbbb"
| 86 || July 13 || @ Phillies || 13 – 3 || Kendrick (4-0) || Wells (3-12) || || 43,838 || 40-46
|- style="background-color:#ffbbbb"
| 87 || July 14 || @ Phillies || 10 – 4 || Hamels (11-4) || Maroth (5-4) || || 45,050 || 40-47
|- style="background-color:#bbffbb"
| 88 || July 15 || @ Phillies || 10 – 2 || Wainwright (8-7) || Eaton (8-6) || || 44,872 || 41-47
|- style="background-color:#bbffbb"
| 89 || July 16 || @ Marlins || 5 – 3 || Looper (7-7) || Kim (4-5) || Isringhausen (18) || 13,827 || 42-47
|- style="background-color:#ffbbbb"
| 90 || July 17 || @ Marlins || 4 – 0 || VandenHurk (3-2) || Thompson (6-4) || || 12,475 || 42-48
|- style="background-color:#bbffbb"
| 91 || July 18 || @ Marlins || 6 – 0 || Wells (4-12) || Willis (7-9) || || 12,819 || 43-48
|- style="background-color:#ffbbbb"
| 92 || July 19 || @ Braves || 10 – 1 || Hudson (10-5) || Maroth (5-5) || || 41,171 || 43-49
|- style="background-color:#bbffbb"
| 93 || July 20 || @ Braves || 4 – 2 || Wainwright (9-7) || Soriano (2-2) || Isringhausen (19) || 42,712 || 44-49
|- style="background-color:#ffbbbb"
| 94 || July 21 || @ Braves || 14 – 6 || Carlyle (5-2) || Looper (7-8) || || 53,953 || 44-50
|- style="background-color:#bbffbb"
| 95 || July 22 || @ Braves || 7 – 2  || Isringhausen (4-0) || Yates (2-2) || || 39,181 || 45-50
|- style="background-color:#ffbbbb"
| 96 || July 24 || Cubs || 4 – 3 || Zambrano (13-7) || Wells (4-13) || Dempster (17) || 45,436 || 45-51
|- style="background-color:#ffbbbb"
| 97 || July 25 || Cubs || 7 – 1 || Lilly (11-4) || Wainwright (9-8) || || 45,316 || 45-52
|- style="background-color:#bbffbb"
| 98 || July 26 || Cubs || 11 – 1 || Looper (8-8) || Marquis (7-6) || || 45,308 || 46-52
|- style="background-color:#ffbbbb"
| 99 || July 27 || Brewers || 12 – 2 || Vargas (9-2) || Maroth (5-6) || || 45,137 || 46-53
|- style="background-color:#bbffbb"
| 100 || July 28 || Brewers || 7 – 6 || Springer (5-1) || Cordero (0-4) || || 45,089 || 47-53
|- style="background-color:#bbffbb"
| 101 || July 28 || Brewers || 5 – 2 ||Reyes (1-10) || Capuano (5-7) || Isringhausen (20) || 45,829 || 48-53
|- style="background-color:#bbffbb"
| 102 || July 29 || Brewers || 9 – 5 ||Franklin (4-0) || Turnbow (2-4) || || 44,854 || 49-53
|- style="background-color:#bbffbb"
| 103 || July 31 || @ Pirates || 6 – 4 ||Wainwright (10-8) || Maholm (7-13) || Isringhausen (21) || 24,085 || 50-53
|- style="background-color:#bbffbb"

|- style="background-color:#ffbbbb"
| 104 || August 1 || @ Pirates || 15 – 1 || Armas (1-3) || Looper (8-9) || || 17,041 || 50-54
|- style="background-color:#ffbbbb"
| 105 || August 2 || @ Pirates || 5 – 4  || Torres (1-3) || Thompson (6-5) || || 19,132 || 50-55
|- style="background-color:#ffbbbb"
| 106 || August 3 || @ Nationals || 3 – 2 || Cordero (2-2) || Franklin (4-1) || || 27,992 || 50-56
|- style="background-color:#ffbbbb"
| 107 || August 4 || @ Nationals || 12 – 1 ||Hanrahan (1-0) || Piñeiro (1-2) || || 29,252 || 50-57
|- style="background-color:#ffbbbb"
| 108 || August 5 || @ Nationals || 6 – 3 ||King (1-0) ||Franklin (4-2) || Cordero (23) || 33,517 || 50-58
|- style="background-color:#bbffbb"
| 109 || August 6 || Padres || 10 – 5 ||Looper (9-9) ||Wells (5-8) || || 42,743 || 51-58
|- style="background-color:#ffbbbb"
| 110 || August 7 || Padres || 4 – 0 || Peavy (12-5) ||Reyes (1-11) || || 42,846 || 51-59
|- style="background-color:#bbffbb"
| 111 || August 8 || Padres || 2 – 1 || Wells (5-13) || Maddux (7-9) || Isringhausen (22) || 42,138 || 52-59
|- style="background-color:#bbffbb"
| 112 || August 9 || Padres || 5 – 0 || Piñeiro (2-2) || Young (9-4) || || 42,848 || 53-59
|- style="background-color:#ffbbbb"
| 113 || August 10 || Dodgers || 2 – 1 || Beimel (3-1) || Wainwright (10-9) || Saito (29) || 44,595 || 53-60
|- style="background-color:#bbffbb"
| 114 || August 11 || Dodgers || 6 – 1 || Looper (10-9) || Lowe (8-11) || || 44,260 || 54-60
|- style="background-color:#bbffbb"
| 115 || August 12 || Dodgers || 12 – 2 || Reyes (2-11) || Hendrickson (4-7) || || 45,379 || 55-60
|- style="background-color:#bbffbb"
| 116 || August 14 || @ Brewers || 12 – 4 || Wells (6-13) || Capuano (5-10) || || 37,518 || 56-60
|- style="background-color:#bbffbb"
| 117 || August 15 || @ Brewers || 8 – 3 || Piñeiro (3-2) || Gallardo (4-3) || || 33,404 || 57-60
|- style="background-color:#bbffbb"
| 118 || August 16 || @ Brewers || 8 – 0 || Wainwright (11-9) || Bush (9-9) || || 36,062 || 58-60
|- style="background-color:#ffbbbb"
| 119 || August 17 || @ Cubs || 2 – 1 || Hill (7-7) || Looper (10-10) || Dempster (18) || 41,634 || 58-61
|- style="background-color:#ffbbbb"
| 120 || August 18 || @ Cubs || 5 – 3 || Marshall (6-6) || Reyes (2-12) || Dempster (19) || 41,369 || 58-62
|- style="background-color:#bbbbbb"
| -- || August 19 || @ Cubs || colspan=5|Postponed (rain),  || 58-62
|- style="background-color:#bbffbb"
| 121 || August 20 || @ Cubs || 6 – 4 || Piñeiro (4-2) || Lilly (13-6) || Isringhausen (23) || 40,141 || 59-62
|- style="background-color:#bbffbb"
| 122 || August 21 || Marlins || 5 – 2 || Percival (3-0) || Benítez (2-8) || Isringhausen (24) || 42,059 || 60-62
|- style="background-color:#bbffbb"
| 123 || August 22 || Marlins || 6 – 4 || Springer (6-1) || Olsen (9-11) || Isringhausen (25) || 42,147 || 61-62
|- style="background-color:#ffbbbb"
| 124 || August 23 || Marlins || 11 – 3 || VandenHurk (4-4) || Reyes (2-13) || || 42,123 || 61-63
|- style="background-color:#ffbbbb"
| 125 || August 24 || Braves || 7 – 2 || Smoltz (12-6) || Wells (6-14) || || 44,032 || 61-64
|- style="background-color:#bbffbb"
| 126 || August 25 || Braves || 5 – 4 || Springer (7-1) || Hudson (15-6) || Isringhausen (26) || 45,441 || 62-64
|- style="background-color:#bbffbb"
| 127 || August 26 || Braves || 4 – 1 || Wainwright (12-9) || Reyes (0-2) || Isringhausen (27) || 43,934 || 63-64
|- style="background-color:#bbffbb"
| 128 || August 28 || @ Astros || 7 – 0 || Looper (11-10) || Williams (8-13) || || 37,915 || 64-64
|- style="background-color:#ffbbbb"
| 129 || August 29 || @ Astros || 7 – 0 || Oswalt (14-6) || Wells (6-15) || || 33,422 || 64-65
|- style="background-color:#ffbbbb"
| 130 || August 30 || @ Astros || 2 – 1 || Albers (4-6) || Piñeiro (4-3) || Lidge (14) || 37,520 || 64-66
|- style="background-color:#bbffbb"
| 131 || August 31 || Reds || 8 – 5 || Flores (2-0) || Majewski (0-2) || || 43,564 || 65-66

|- style="background-color:#bbffbb"
| 132 || September 1 || Reds || 11 – 3 || Wainwright (13-9) || Dumatrait (0-3) || || 42,356 || 66-66
|- style="background-color:#bbffbb"
| 133 || September 2 || Reds || 3 – 2 || Looper (12-10) || Arroyo (7-14) || Isringhausen (28) || 44,223 || 67-66
|- style="background-color:#ffbbbb"
| 134 || September 3 || Pirates || 11 – 0 || Snell (9-11) || Wells (6-16) || || 42,238 || 67-67
|- style="background-color:#bbffbb"
| 135 || September 4 || Pirates || 6 – 2 || Piñeiro (5-3) || Morris (8-9) || Franklin (1) || 42,300 || 68-67
|- style="background-color:#ffbbbb"
| 136 || September 5 || Pirates || 8 – 2 || Armas (3-5) || Mulder (0-1) || || 42,299 || 68-68
|- style="background-color:#bbffbb"
| 137 || September 6 || Pirates || 16 – 4  || Jiménez (2-0) || Bullington (0-1) || || 42,330 || 69-68
|- style="background-color:#ffbbbb"
| 138 || September 7 || @ D-backs || 4 – 2 || Webb (15-10) || Wainwright (13-10) || Valverde (43) || 31,225 || 69-69
|- style="background-color:#ffbbbb"
| 139 || September 8 || @ D-backs || 9 – 8 || Eveland (1-0) || Wellemeyer (3-3) || Valverde (44) || 45,931 || 69-70
|- style="background-color:#ffbbbb"
| 140 || September 9 || @ D-backs || 6 – 5 || Petit (3-4) || Franklin (4-3) || Valverde (45) || 35,136 || 69-71
|- style="background-color:#ffbbbb"
| 141 || September 10 || @ Cubs || 12 – 3 || Lilly (15-7) || Piñeiro (5-4) || || 40,358 || 69-72
|- style="background-color:#ffbbbb"
| 142 || September 11 || @ Reds || 7 – 2 || Belisle (8-8) || Mulder (0-2) || || 14,027 || 69-73
|- style="background-color:#ffbbbb"
| 143 || September 12 || @ Reds || 5 – 1 || Arroyo (9-14) || Reyes (2-14) || || 16,167 || 69-74
|- style="background-color:#ffbbbb"
| 144 || September 13 || @ Reds || 5 – 4 || Harang (15-4) || Wells (6-17) || Weathers (30) || 18,018 || 69-75
|- style="background-color:#ffbbbb"
| 145 || September 14 || Cubs || 5 – 3 || Zambrano (16-12) || Wainwright (13-11) || Howry (8) || 45,750 || 69-76
|- style="background-color:#ffbbbb"
| 146 || September 15 || Cubs || 3 – 2 || Wood (1-1) || Franklin (4-4) || Dempster (27) || 45,918 || 69-77
|- style="background-color:#bbffbb"
| 147 || September 15 || Cubs || 4 – 3 || Piñeiro (6-4) || Marshall (7-8) || Isringhausen (29) || 45,894 || 70-77
|- style="background-color:#ffbbbb"
| 148 || September 16 || Cubs || 4 – 2 || Marquis (12-8) || Mulder (0-3) || Dempster (28) || 45,735 || 70-78
|- style="background-color:#ffbbbb"
| 149 || September 17 || Phillies || 13 – 11 || Kendrick (9-4) || Thompson (6-6) || Rosario (1) || 42,031 || 70-79
|- style="background-color:#ffbbbb"
| 150 || September 18 || Phillies || 7 – 4  || Mesa (2-3) || Maroth (5-7) || Condrey (1) || 42,170 || 70-80
|- style="background-color:#bbffbb"
| 151 || September 19 || Phillies || 2 – 1  || Flores (3-0) || Myers (4-7) || || 44,337 || 71-80
|- style="background-color:#ffbbbb"
| 152 || September 20 || Astros || 18 – 1 || Rodríguez (9-13) || Looper (12-11) || || 42,171 || 71-81
|- style="background-color:#ffbbbb"
| 153 || September 21 || Astros || 6 – 3 || Backe (2-1) || Piñeiro (6-5) || Lidge (16) || 43,677 || 71-82
|- style="background-color:#bbffbb"
| 154 || September 22 || Astros || 7 – 4 || Thompson (7-6) || Albers (4-10) || Isringhausen (30) || 46,237 || 72-82
|- style="background-color:#bbffbb"
| 155 || September 23 || Astros || 4 – 3 || Jiménez (3-0) || Lidge (5-3) || || 46,169 || 73-82
|- style="background-color:#ffbbbb"
| 156 || September 24 || @ Brewers || 13 – 5 || Bush (12-10) || Wainwright (13-12) || || 40,908 || 73-83
|- style="background-color:#ffbbbb"
| 157 || September 25 || @ Brewers || 9 – 1 || Suppan (11-12) || Looper (12-12) || || 32,329 || 73-84
|- style="background-color:#bbffbb"
| 158 || September 26 || @ Brewers || 7 – 3 || Thompson (8-6) || Villanueva (8-5) || || 32,411 || 74-84
|- style="background-color:#bbffbb"
| 159 || September 27 || @ Mets || 3 – 0 || Piñeiro (7-5) || Martínez (3-1) || Isringhausen (31) || 48,900 || 75-84
|- style="background-color:#bbffbb"
| 160 || September 28 || @ Pirates || 6 – 1 || Springer (8-1) || Grabow (3-2) || || 30,603 || 76-84
|- style="background-color:#bbffbb"
| 161 || September 29 || @ Pirates || 7 – 3 || Wainwright (14-12) || Gorzelanny (14-10) || || 35,169 || 77-84
|- style="background-color:#bbffbb"
| 162 || September 30 || @ Pirates || 6 – 5 || Wells (7-17) || Bullington (0-3) || Isringhausen' (32) || 25,664 || 78-84

Player stats

Starting batters by positionNote: Pos = Position; G = Games played; AB = At bats; R = Runs; H = Hits; Avg. = Batting average; HR = Home runs; RBI = Runs batted inOther battersNote: G = Games played; AB = At bats; R = Runs; H = Hits; Avg. = Batting average; HR = Home runs; RBI = Runs batted in Starting and other pitchers Note: GS = Games started; IP = Innings pitched; H = Hits allowed; W = Wins; L = Losses; ERA = Earned run average; BB = Walks allowed; SO = Strikeouts; WHIP= Walks+hits÷innings pitched; O-AVG = Opponents batting average Relief pitchers Note: G = Games pitched; IP = Innings pitched; H = Hits allowed; W = Wins; L = Losses; SV = Saves; R = Runs allowed; ERA = Earned run average; BB = Walks allowed; SO = Strikeouts; WHIP = Walks+hits÷innings pitched; O-AVG = Opponents batting average'' 

 *  incl. 1 GS, 1.0 IP, 1 H, 0 R, 0 BB, 0 SO

 **  died early in the morning of April 29

Busch Stadium (Indexes)
(100 = Neutral Park, > 100 Ballpark favors, < 100 Ballpark inhibits 
  81 G; Cardinals: 2,704 AB;   Opponents: 2,866 AB)

BA 102  
R  93  
H  103  
2B 96  
3B 104  
HR 71  
BB 96  
SO 88  
E 117  
E-inf. 118  
LHB-BA 103  
LHB-HR 68  
RHB-BA 102  
RHB-HR  74

Farm system

References

External links

2007 St. Louis Cardinals page at Baseball Reference; links to game logs and statistics

St. Louis Cardinals seasons
St. Louis Cardinals
St Louis